Peziza ampelina is a species of apothecial fungus belonging to the family Pezizaceae. This European fungus appears as violet-coloured cups up to 5 cm across on soil or burnt wood. The spores are quite large, with a smooth surface, unusual for the genus.

References

Pezizaceae
Fungi described in 1874